Deshan Withanage (born 21 February 1997) is a Sri Lankan cricketer. He made his first-class debut for Galle Cricket Club in the 2015–16 Premier League Tournament on 11 December 2015.

References

External links
 

1997 births
Living people
Sri Lankan cricketers
Galle Cricket Club cricketers
People from Matara, Sri Lanka